The Cyber and Electro Magnetic Activities Effects Group (CEMA Effects Group) is a combat support formation of the British Army due to form by late 2022. The group will bring together three specialist regiments of the Royal Corps of Signals under Commander Field Army.

History 

As part of the Army 2020 and subsequently Army 2020 Refine programmes, the 14th Signal Regiment (Electronic Warfare) under control of the 1st Intelligence, Surveillance and Reconnaissance Brigade (6th (UK) Division), while the 13th Signal Regiment was formed in June 2020 under 1st (UK) Signal Brigade (6th (UK) Division) as the first dedicated cyber unit.  The last regiment, 21st Signal Regiment was under 7th Signal Group, part of 11th Signal Brigade and Headquarters West Midlands (1st (UK) Division, later 3rd (UK) Division).  However, under the Future Soldier programme, these three units will be grouped together into a new Colonel's command (Group) and become the "Cyber and Electro Magnetic Activities Effects Group".

The group will, alongside 16th Air Assault Brigade Combat Team, the Intelligence, Surveillance, and Reconnaissance Group, 2nd Medical Group, and the Land Warfare Centre be part of Field Army Troops, a sub-command of the Field Army which is under direct control of Field Army HQ.

The group's role was described as follows "The Cyber and Electro Magnetic Activities (CEMA) Effects Group will command the Army's two Electronic Warfare and Signals Intelligence (EWSI) regiments; 14th and 21st Signals Regiments, and the cyber regiment, 13th Signals Regiment; delivering cutting edge technical capability to the point of need".

Structure 
The structure of the group by 2030 will be as follows:

 Group Headquarters, at Marlborough Lines, Andover
 13th Signal Regiment, Royal Corps of Signals, at Basil Hill Barracks, Corsham – cyber operations
 14th Signal Regiment, Royal Corps of Signals, at Imjin Barracks, Innsworth – electronic warfare operations
 21st Signal Regiment, Royal Corps of Signals, at Imjin Barracks, Innsworth – electronic warfare operations

Footnotes 

Group sized units of the British Army
Communications units and formations of the British Army
Military units and formations established in 2022